Ernst Anders Mikael Boman (born 14 July 1988) is a Swedish footballer who plays as a forward for Halmstads BK.

Career

Early career
Mikael Boman was born and raised in the small town of Kungsbacka in northern Halland and started in an early age in the local club Kungsbacka IB in Division 6. At the age of 14 he was given the chance in the senior team, this was followed by offers from IFK Göteborg and Örgryte IS to play in their youth teams, which he rejected, he also rejected to represent Halland on the Elitpojklägret (Elite youth camp), a youth camp from which youngest of Sweden U17's teams is selected from. Boman then signed for IFK Fjärås in Division 3, his first season with the club went poorly as the club was relegated, however the following season Boman helped the club return by scoring 10 goals and the success continued as Boman became top goalscorer in the Division and Fjärås came in second place, which resulted in a promotion playoff against Sävedalens IF, a 3–8 defeat totally.

Falkenbergs FF
However his playing had not gone unnoticed as Falkenbergs FF signed him, while in Falkenberg he primarily became second striker behind Joel Johansson, Stefan Rodevåg and Daniel Alexandersson in succession, despite this Boman did a fair number of matches and scored a number of goals for Falkenberg. During his time in Falkenberg he was given a limited amount of attention until 2010 as he scored 4 goals in a match against Assyriska FF, prior to the match he had contacted his old teammate Jens Gustafsson, manager in Halmstads BK, and stated an interest to play for Halmstads BK and Jens sent up a scout to have a look at him during the Assyriska match.

Halmstads BK
On 13 October 2011 Halmstads BK announced that they had signed Mikael Boman as bosman, which resulted in Falkenbergs FF becoming upset as they considered it a bad behavior announcing the transfer before the season was fully over.

Halmstads BK was relegated prior to the end of the 2011 Allsvenskan season, in Superettan Mikael Boman teamed up with Icelandic forward Guðjón Baldvinsson to form Halmstads forward pair, the pair became one of the main reason for Halmstads return to Allsvenskan as they scored 29 out of Halmstads 61 goals, Boman scoring 13 of them, finishing in 6th position in the overall goalscorer league.

IFK Göteborg
On 23 October 2014 he signed a three-year-long contract with his old favorite team IFK Göteborg.

Randers FC
Boman signed for Danish Superliga club Randers FC on 31 January 2018. He left the club at the end of the 2018/19 season and returned to Halmstad BK.

Personal life
Prior to completely focusing on football, he also played table tennis for Tölö BTK.

Career statistics

Honours
;IFK Göteborg
 Svenska Cupen: 2014–15
Individual
Division 3 Sydvästra Götaland top scorer: 2007

References

External links
 

1988 births
People from Kungsbacka
Living people
Swedish footballers
Association football forwards
Superettan players
Allsvenskan players
Division 3 (Swedish football) players
Danish Superliga players
Falkenbergs FF players
Halmstads BK players
IFK Göteborg players
Swedish expatriate footballers
Expatriate men's footballers in Denmark
Randers FC players
Sportspeople from Halland County